Knox Farm State Park is a  state park located in Erie County, New York, adjacent to the village of East Aurora. It is the former country estate of the Knox Family of Buffalo.

Park features
The park contains a variety of habitats, including grasslands, woodlands, ponds and wetlands. The Knox Farm, located within the park, is still home to a number of farm animals, including horses, sheep, goats, llamas and chickens.

Visitors can observe wildlife, hike and cross-country ski through a number of nature trails; bicycles, however, are only permitted in certain areas. Nature walks and programs are offered by the New York State Parks. The Knox Farm Visitor Center contains exhibits of historical and natural interest.

Nature trails can also be toured on horseback by permit only. Horse owners must also have a current Coggins certificate.  The park also offers use of stable facilities and riding lessons. There are also several equestrian events open to the public, such as horse shows, summer polo matches and an annual carriage drive.

Friends of Knox Farm State Park
The Friends of Knox Farm State Park is a not-for-profit group dedicated to maintaining and promoting the park and its resources. The group holds several events for that purpose. In February 2014, the Friends of Knox Farm Board of Directors voted to replace Seymour Knox IV, who had served as president of the group since its founding  in 2006.  This resulted in the resignation of eight members of the board including Knox and other members of the Knox family.

Gallery

See also
List of New York state parks

References

External links
 New York State Parks: Knox Farm State Park
 Friends of Knox Farm State Park, Inc.

State parks of New York (state)
Knox family
Parks in Erie County, New York
Nature centers in New York (state)